Sven Axel Richard Landberg (6 December 1888 – 11 April 1962) was a Swedish gymnast and football player. He was part of the Swedish gymnastics teams that won gold medals at the 1908 and in the 1912 Summer Olympics.

References

1888 births
1962 deaths
Swedish male artistic gymnasts
Swedish footballers
Gymnasts at the 1908 Summer Olympics
Gymnasts at the 1912 Summer Olympics
Olympic gymnasts of Sweden
Olympic gold medalists for Sweden
Olympic medalists in gymnastics
Djurgårdens IF Fotboll players
Medalists at the 1912 Summer Olympics
Medalists at the 1908 Summer Olympics
Association footballers not categorized by position
Sportspeople from Stockholm